Broadwater is an unincorporated community in New Madrid County, in the U.S. state of Missouri.

History
A post office called Broadwater was established in 1904, and remained in operation until 1917. The community was named for the Broadwater irrigation ditch.

References

Unincorporated communities in New Madrid County, Missouri
Unincorporated communities in Missouri